Chauri-Chaura is a constituency of the Uttar Pradesh Legislative Assembly covering the city of Chauri-Chaura in the Gorakhpur district of Uttar Pradesh, India.

Chauri-Chaura is one of five assembly constituencies in the Bansgaon Lok Sabha constituency. Since 2008, this assembly constituency is numbered 326 amongst 403 constituencies.

Members of the Legislative Assembly

Election results

2022

2017
Bharatiya Janta Party candidate Sangeeta Yadav, won in last Assembly election of 2017 Uttar Pradesh Legislative Elections defeating Samajwadi Party candidate Manurojan Yadav by a margin of 45,660 votes.

References

External links
 

Assembly constituencies of Uttar Pradesh
Politics of Gorakhpur district